The 2005–06 Euro Hockey Tour was the tenth season of the Euro Hockey Tour. The season consisted of four tournaments, the Česká Pojišťovna Cup, Karjala Tournament, Rosno Cup, and the LG Hockey Games. The top two teams met in the final, and the third and fourth place teams met for the third place game.

Tournaments

Česká Pojišťovna Cup
Sweden won the Česká Pojišťovna Cup.

Karjala Tournament
Finland won the Karjala Tournament.

Rosno Cup
Russia won the Rosno Cup.

LG Hockey Games
Russia won the Sweden Hockey Games.

Final standings

Final tournament
The EHT finals 2005–06 were played in Globe Arena, Stockholm, Sweden, on May 1, 2006. Russia beat Sweden in the final with 2-1 and won the EHT. Finland won over Czech Republic with 3-2 and clinched the 3rd place.

References
Season on hockeyarchives.info

 
2005–06 in European ice hockey
Euro Hockey Tour